General Cutler may refer to:

Elliott C. Cutler Jr. (1920–2006), U.S. Army brigadier general
Elliott Cutler (1888–1947), U.S. Army brigadier general
Lysander Cutler (1807–1866), Union Army brigadier general and brevet major general